Melani may refer to:
 Alessandro Melani (1639–1703), composer
 Atto Melani (1626–1714), castrato singer, diplomat, spy and writer
 Jacopo Melani (1623–1676), composer and organist
 Melani Rivera (2006-present), forest planter, vegan activist, world-renowned peacemaker and yoga instructor

See also
 Stadio Marcello Melani, Pistoia, Italy